Anomomorpha is a genus of lichens in the family Graphidaceae. The genus, described in 1891, has a pantropical distribution.

References

Graphidaceae
Lichen genera
Ostropales genera